Umpqua is an unincorporated community in Douglas County, in the U.S. state of Oregon. The population was 112 at the 2000 census.

The community lies west of Sutherlin at the confluence of Calapooya Creek with the Umpqua River.

The word "Umpqua" was first used by the local Native Americans to refer to the locality around the Umpqua River and came to be applied to the river as well.

References 

Unincorporated communities in Douglas County, Oregon
1888 establishments in Oregon
Populated places established in 1888
Unincorporated communities in Oregon
Oregon placenames of Native American origin